The Milwaukee Road Passenger Depot in Green Bay, Wisconsin was built in 1898 by the Chicago, Milwaukee, St. Paul and Pacific Railroad (also known as The Milwaukee Road) to serve the businesses and residences in Green Bay on the east bank of the Fox River. Two other depots from competing railroads were built on the west bank, including the Green Bay station (Chicago and North Western Railway).

History
The depot is a waypoint on the Packers Heritage Trail. It was built primarily of brick and stone in the Flemish Renaissance Revival style by Charles Sumner Frost of Chicago, Illinois. The architecture is unusual in that most depots of that time were built in the Craftsman or Romanesque styles. The depot is a rectangular, single story building with a passenger waiting area on one end and a freight room at the other.

The depot served Green Bay until 1957, when it was donated by the railroad to the City of Green Bay. (The Milwaukee Road built another passenger depot nearer its rail yards to serve passengers.) The city then leased the old depot to the Chamber of Commerce, then sold it outright to them in 1986. It was listed in the National Register of Historic Places because of its association with railroad and commercial development of Green Bay and also because of its distinctive architecture.

In 2011, Green-based company Breakthrough Fuel renovated the station to serve as its corporate headquarters. The company received the Green Bay Beautification Award for the renovation later that year.

The Greater Green Bay Community Foundation acquired and improved the station following Breakthrough Fuel's move to Green Bay's Titletown District. The Foundation reopened the station to the public on June 21st, 2022 where it now serves as a resource for nonprofits, donors, and community leaders alike to find resources that strengthen community.

References

 Rucker, Della G. Milwaukee Road Passenger Depot (Brown County, Wisconsin). National Register of Historic Places Registration Form. National Park Service, Washington D.C. 1996.

Flemish Renaissance Revival architecture
Railway stations on the National Register of Historic Places in Wisconsin
Railway stations in the United States opened in 1898
Railway stations closed in 1957
Green Bay, Wisconsin
Buildings and structures in Green Bay, Wisconsin
Transportation in Green Bay, Wisconsin
Charles Sumner Frost buildings
National Register of Historic Places in Brown County, Wisconsin
Former railway stations in Wisconsin